The NHL Challenge series allows select NHL teams to travel outside North America to conduct training camp and participate in exhibition games. Although the games are played on the larger European ice surface, they are officiated by NHL referees and linesmen using NHL rules.

List of games
2000
 September 13, Vancouver Canucks vs Modo Hockey 5–2 (Stockholm Globe Arena)
 September 15, Vancouver Canucks vs Djurgårdens IF 2–1 (Stockholm Globe Arena)

2001
 September 17, Colorado Avalanche vs Brynäs IF 5–3 (Stockholm Globe Arena)

2003
 September 16, Toronto Maple Leafs vs Jokerit 5–3 (Hartwall Areena)
 September 18, Toronto Maple Leafs vs Djurgårdens IF 9–2 (Stockholm Globe Arena)
 September 19, Toronto Maple Leafs vs Färjestad BK 3–0 (Stockholm Globe Arena)

2010
 October 2, Boston Bruins vs Belfast Giants 5-1 (Odyssey Arena) (Selects' game)

See also
 Super Series
 Summit Series
 Rendez-vous '87
 Victoria Cup
 List of KHL vs NHL games

References

Challenge
Challenge
Challenge
Challenge
NHL
NHL
NHL
NHL
2000
2003
2001
2010